Romania competed at the 2020 Summer Olympics in Tokyo. Originally scheduled to take place from 24 July to 9 August 2020, the Games were postponed to 23 July to 8 August 2021, because of the COVID-19 pandemic. Since the nation's participation started in 1900 (and its official debut in 1924), Romanian athletes have appeared in every edition of the Summer Olympic Games, except for two occasions: the 1932 Summer Olympics in Los Angeles at the period of the worldwide Great Depression, and the 1948 Summer Olympics in London.

Medalists

| width="78%" align="left" valign="top" |

| width="22%" align="left" valign="top" |

Competitors
The following is the list of number of competitors in the Games. Note that reserves in football are not counted:

Archery

One Romanian archer qualified for the women's individual recurve by winning the gold medal and booking the first of six available spots at the 2021 Final Qualification Tournament in Paris, France.

Athletics

Romanian athletes further achieved the entry standards, either by qualifying time or by world ranking, in the following track and field events (up to a maximum of 3 athletes in each event):

Track & road events

Field events

Basketball

Summary

3x3 basketball

Women's tournament

Romania women's national 3x3 team qualified directly for the Olympics by securing an outright berth, as one of the four highest-ranked squads, in the women's category of the FIBA rankings, marking the country's return to the sport for the first time since 1952.

Team roster
The players were announced on 8 July 2021.

Claudia Cuic
Gabriela Mărginean
Ancuţa Stoenescu
Sonia Ursu-Kim

Group play

Boxing

Romania entered two boxers (one per gender) into the Olympic tournament. Cosmin Gîrleanu (men's flyweight) and Maria Nechita (women's featherweight) secured the spots on the Romanian squad in their respective weight divisions, either by winning the round of 16 match, advancing to the semifinal match, or scoring a box-off triumph, at the 2020 European Qualification Tournament in London and Paris.

Canoeing

Sprint
Romania qualified a single boat in the men's C-2 1000 m for the Games by finishing fifth in the final race at the 2019 ICF Canoe Sprint World Championships in Szeged, Hungary.

Qualification Legend: FA = Qualify to final (medal); FB = Qualify to final B (non-medal)

Cycling

Road
Romania entered one rider to compete in the men's Olympic road race, by virtue of his top 50 national finish (for men) in the UCI World Ranking.

Mountain biking
Romania entered one mountain biker to compete in the men's cross-country race with a gold-medal victory in the under-23 division at the 2019 UCI Mountain Bike World Championships in Mont-Sainte-Anne, Canada, marking the country's return to the sport at the Olympics for the first time since Athens 2004.

Fencing

Romania entered two fencers into the Olympic competition. Set to compete at her fifth consecutive Games, Ana Maria Popescu claimed a spot in the women's épée as one of the two highest-ranked fencers vying for qualification from Europe in the FIE Adjusted Official Rankings. Meanwhile, Iulian Teodosiu rounded out the Romanian roster by winning the final match of the men's sabre at the European Zonal Qualifier in Madrid, Spain.

Football

Summary

Men's tournament

Romania men's football team qualified for the Games by advancing to the semifinal stage of the 2019 UEFA European Under-21 Championship in Italy, signifying the country's return to the Olympic tournament after 56 years.

Team roster

Group play

Gymnastics

Artistic
Romania entered three artistic gymnasts into the Olympic competition. Going to his sixth Games, Marian Drăgulescu claimed one of the three spots available for individual-based gymnasts and progressed to the finals of the men's vault exercise. On the women's side, 19-year-old rookie Maria Holbură finished 13th out of the 20 gymnasts eligible for qualification in the individual all-around and apparatus events to ensure an Olympic berth for the Romanian squad at the 2019 World Championships in Stuttgart, Germany. Larisa Iordache added another spot for the Romanians to join Holbură on the gymnastics roster for her second trip to the Games after placing fourth in the individual all-around at the 2021 European Championships in Basel, Switzerland.

At the Olympics, Iordache was injured during qualifications, and she withdrew from the rest of the competition.

Men

Women

Judo

Romania qualified three judoka (two men and one woman) for each of the following weight classes at the Games. London 2012 Olympian Vlăduț Simionescu (men's heavyweight, +100 kg) and two-time Olympian Andreea Chițu (women's half-lightweight, 52 kg) were selected among the top 18 judoka of their respective weight classes based on the IJF World Ranking List of June 28, 2021, while rookie Alexandru Raicu (men's lightweight, 73 kg) accepted a continental berth from Europe as the nation's top-ranked judoka outside of direct qualifying position.

Rowing

Romania qualified nine out of fourteen boats for each of the following rowing classes into the Olympic regatta, with the majority of crews confirming Olympic places for their boats at the 2019 FISA World Championships in Ottensheim, Austria. Meanwhile, two more crews (men's and women's eight) were added to the Romanian roster with their top-two finish at the 2021 FISA Final Qualification Regatta in Lucerne, Switzerland.

Men

Women

Qualification Legend: FA=Final A (medal); FB=Final B (non-medal); FC=Final C (non-medal); FD=Final D (non-medal); FE=Final E (non-medal); FF=Final F (non-medal); SA/B=Semifinals A/B; SC/D=Semifinals C/D; SE/F=Semifinals E/F; QF=Quarterfinals; R=Repechage

Shooting

Romanian shooters achieved quota places for the following events by virtue of their best finishes at the 2018 ISSF World Championships, the 2019 ISSF World Cup series, European Championships or Games, and European Qualifying Tournament, as long as they obtained a minimum qualifying score (MQS) by July 5, 2021.

Swimming 

Romanian swimmers achieved qualifying standards in the following events (up to a maximum of 2 swimmers in each event at the Olympic Qualifying Time (OQT), and potentially 1 at the Olympic Selection Time (OST)):

Table tennis

Romania entered four athletes into the table tennis competition at the Games. The women's team secured a berth by advancing to the quarterfinal round of the 2020 World Olympic Qualification Event in Gondomar, Portugal, permitting a maximum of two starters to compete in the women's singles tournament. Meanwhile, Rio 2016 Olympian Ovidiu Ionescu scored a third-stage semifinal triumph to secure one of the five available places in the men's singles at the European Qualification Tournament in Odivelas, Portugal.

Tennis

Romania entered two tennis players into the Olympic tournament. Rio 2016 Olympians Monica Niculescu and Raluca Olaru teamed up with each other to compete in the women's doubles based on their combined WTA World Rankings of June 13, 2021.

Triathlon

Romania entered one triathlete to compete at the Olympics for the first time in history. French-born Felix Duchampt topped the field of triathletes vying for qualification from Europe in the men's event based on the individual ITU World Rankings of 15 June 2021.

Wrestling

Romania qualified four wrestlers for each of the following classes into the Olympic competition. One of them finished among the top six to claim an Olympic slot in the women's freestyle 50 kg at the 2019 World Championships, while three additional licenses were awarded to the Romanian wrestlers, who progressed to the top two finals of the men's freestyle 97 kg, women's freestyle 53 kg, and men's Greco-Roman 130 kg, respectively, at the 2021 World Qualification Tournament in Sofia, Bulgaria.

On June 15, 2021, United World Wrestling awarded an additional Olympic license to Kriszta Incze in the women's freestyle 62 kg, as the next highest-ranked wrestler vying for qualification, citing North Korea's withdrawal from the Games.

Freestyle

Greco-Roman

References

Nations at the 2020 Summer Olympics
2020
2021 in Romanian sport